Klarisse de Guzman (born September 6, 1991) is a Filipino singer and composer who rose to prominence after placing as the first-runner up of the first season of The Voice of the Philippines in 2013 and being crowned the winner of the third season of Your Face Sounds Familiar in 2021.

Regarded as the “Philippines Soul Diva”, De Guzman is recognized as one of the most sought-after artists of her generation. In 2017, she won "Most Influential Female Concert Performers of the Year" with Angeline, Jona and Morissette at The 7th EdukCircle Awards. The following year, she bagged the "Most Promising Female Concert Artist of the Year" trophy at the Box Office Entertainment Awards.  

She is an artist under ABS-CBN's training and management subsidiary, Star Magic and was also a member of the Filipino singing quartet, Birit Queens. In 2016, she competed in the celebrity competition We Love OPM as part of the singing trio O Diva which landed as the competition's third placer.

Early life 
De Guzman was born on September 6, 1991 in Makati, Philippines. She has been labeled as a "kontesera" (literally contest-woman) as she has competed in various singing competitions since her childhood years. In 2001 when she was nine, she landed second place in Batang Kampeon where Almira Cercado of 4th Impact and Jake Zyrus (formerly Charice Pempengco) were also contestants. De Guzman also competed in Star for a Night along with Angeline Quinto and Sarah Geronimo, the latter becoming her coach in the first season of The Voice of the Philippines. While an AB Music Production student at the De La Salle–College of Saint Benilde, she was member of a band called Turning Point. She was also a student when she auditioned for The Voice.

Career

2013-2015: The Voice, MCA Music, and first concert
De Guzman auditioned on the first season of The Voice of the Philippines in 2013 with the song Tulak Ng Bibig by Julianne Tarroja. All of the show's coaches, Bamboo Mañalac, Sarah Geronimo, Lea Salonga, and apl.de.ap (in order) turned their respective chair to express interest in mentoring her. De Guzman shared after performing her audition song that she once joined Star for a Night which made Geronimo surprised as she did not recognize her at first. The four-chair turner eventually chose Geronimo to be her coach in the competition. She proceeded in the Battles Round and performed Somebody That I Used to Know with Gabriel Ramos and Rouxette Swinton. After winning the round, she proceeded with the live shows. She performed Beggin', I Can't Make You Love Me, The Voice Within with Morissette, and the Michael Bolton version of To Love Somebody. After accumulating higher scores from public votes and the team coach, she beat Amon during the Top 8 competition making her part of the top four artists who will compete during the grand finals. At the first round of the grand finals, she competed against the remaining contestants, Janice Javier, Myk Perez, and Mitoy Yonting. She performed The Climb and together with her coach and Robert Seña, Your Song. Javier and Perez were eliminated at the first round leaving Yonting and de Guzman fight in the second round for the champion title. De Guzman sang "Magsimula Ka" by Leo Valdez and ended up as runner-up with 42.35% score against Yonting's 57.65%.

De Guzman since then has been appearing on TV shows aired by ABS-CBN, particularly ASAP. In January 2014, Klarisse was officially announced in the said program as the latest addition to the Star Magic artists. She also became part of the singing trio, ASAP Homegrown Divas together with Morissette and Angeline Quinto.

After competing in The Voice, she signed a record and management deal with MCA Music along with Janice Javier, Myk Perez, and Paolo Onesa who were her co-finalists from The Voice. Her first album entitled "Klarisse de Guzman" featured songs from her contest pieces from the competition. These were The Climb, To Love Somebody, and I Can't Make You Love Me. It also featured Sabihin Mo Sa Akin which became the theme song of Mirabella as well as a self-composed song, "Di Kayang Pilitin."

Also in 2014, she had a solo concert entitled The Voice of Klarisse De Guzman: Live on Concert. It was held at Teatrino, Promenade Mall on August 29, 2014 with Nyoy Volante, Juan Karlos Labajo, and Paolo Onesa as guests.

2016-2020: Himig Handog, Birit Queens, We Love OPM, and Star Music
De Guzman also became an interpreter at the 2016 Himig Handog, a songwriting and music video competition. She interpreted "Sana'y Tumibok Muli" composed by Jose Joel Mendoza. The music video was produced by Asia Pacific College. The song took the 5th Best Song award during the grand finals held at the Kia Theatre on April 24, 2016 and became part of the album, Himig Handog P-Pop Love Songs (2016).

In May 2016, she joined Liezel Garcia and Emmanuelle Vera to form the group O Diva as part of ABS-CBN's music competition, We Love OPM, under the mentorship of KZ Tandingan. The competition was joined by five other groups of musical artists to weekly perform a song of the week's featured Filipino artist. The trio performed Ikaw Ang Pangarap, Katawan, Gaya ng Dati, Kung Kailangan Mo Ako (together with Power Chords group), Basang-basa Sa Ulan, Karakaraka, and Batang-Bata Ka Pa. The group consistently ranked at the upper percentile each week and was exempted to compete during the semi-finals after gathering the most number of points across episodes. During the grand finals held at the Newport Performing Arts Theater in Resorts World Manila on July 17, 2016, O Diva performed "Limang Dipang Tao" and landed third place with 57.78% final score.

In May 2016, a vocal showdown was conducted in ASAP where De Guzman performed with Angeline Quinto, Morissette, and Jona who has just transferred to ABS-CBN from GMA Network. Later on, the Birit Queens (literally Belting Queens) was formed which was composed of the four singers. The quartet regularly performed in ASAP and became guests on different TV shows from the network.

In October 2016, De Guzman along with other The Voice alumni Juan Karlos Labajo and Jason Dy staged a concert named One Voice at the Music Museum. Liezl Garcia and Emmanuelle Vera also performed in the concert along with De Guzman during one segment to regroup as O Diva.

The group Birit Queens held its concert at the MOA Arena in March 2017. The concert continued outside the Philippines where they also performed at the National Theater of Abu Dhabi on April. The quartet then brought the concert in the United States of America. The Birit Queens had their final performance as a group on a pre-taped episode on October 29, 2017.

In 2017, she had her second album under Star Music and was titled "Klarisse". It featured "Wala na Talaga" as carrier single. The song was used as the theme song of the Philippine airing of the To the Dearest Intruder (titled My Dearest Intruder in the Philippines). "Ikaw at Ako", a duet with Morissette and was the theme song of Doble Kara, was also included in the album.

In 2018, she and Michael Pangilinan covered "Araw-Araw, Gabi-Gabi" to serve as the theme song of the drama television series Araw Gabi. The same year, she also released a single called "NBSB" which stands for No Boyfriend Since Birth under Star Pop PH.

2021-present: Your Face Sounds Familiar Season 3 and It's Showtime
In February 2021, De Guzman was revealed to be one of the eight contestants of the third season of the TV show, Your Face Sounds Familiar. She was a four-time weekly winner in the competition. During the third week, she won as the celebrity winner by impersonating  Jaya with the song "Hanggang Dito na Lang." She was again declared as the weekly winner during the fifth week by impersonating Minnie Riperton with the song "Lovin' You" as well as during the ninth week by impersonating Sharon Cuneta with the song "Sana'y Wala Nang Wakas". She bagged her fourth weekly winner title during the eleventh week by impersonating Aretha Franklin with the song "Respect". At the end of the competition, she was declared as the season's Grand Winner with a score of 90%. 

In May 2021, she released a new single titled Ulan ng Kahapon under StarPop. In June 2021, ASOP Music Festival's 2021 commemorative album was released. De Guzman became part of the album where she recorded her rendition of God is with Us from the 7th ASOP Music Festival. 

Also in June 2021, she became one of the judges of Tawag ng Tanghalan of  It's Showtime. She was also one of the hosts of the twelfth anniversary episode of the show in November 2021.

In early 2022, she became one of the regular SING-vestigators of the fourth season of I Can See Your Voice. However, her stint was short-lived as from the 7th episode, she was replaced by original SING-vestigator Angeline Quinto.

Discography

Compilation albums
 The Voice of the Philippines: The Final 16 (2013)
 The Voice of the Philippines: The Final 4 (2013)
 Dreamscape Televisions of Love, Vol. 1 (2015)
 My Christmas Album All Stars (Deluxe) (2015)
 The Hottest Pinoy Hits Ever (2016)
 Himig Handog P-Pop Love Songs 2016 (2016)

Studio albums
 Klarisse de Guzman (2014)
 Klarisse (2017)

Concerts

Solo concerts

Awards and nominations

Notes

Filmography 

Klarisse mostly appears on ASAP. She also guested on few occasions on iWant ASAP. She also had multiple visits on Umagang Kay Ganda, Kris TV, and Magandang Buhay where she was invited to be interviewed and to perform. She has also performed on It's Showtime on different occasions apart from being invited as celebrity contestant on different contests of the TV show.

References

External links
Klarisse de Guzman's profile on Star Magic

1991 births
Living people
21st-century Filipino women singers
Singers from Makati
ABS-CBN personalities
De La Salle–College of Saint Benilde alumni
The Voice of the Philippines contestants